

Crown
Head of State – Queen Elizabeth II

Federal government
Governor General – Roméo LeBlanc

Cabinet
Prime Minister –  Jean Chrétien
Deputy Prime Minister – Sheila Copps then Herb Gray
Minister of Finance – Paul Martin
Minister of Foreign Affairs – Lloyd Axworthy
Minister of National Defence – Doug Young then Art Eggleton
Minister of Health – David Dingwall then Allan Rock
Minister of Industry – John Manley
Minister of Heritage – Sheila Copps
Minister of Intergovernmental Affairs – Stéphane Dion
Minister of the Environment – Sergio Marchi then Christine Stewart
Minister of Justice – Allan Rock then Anne McLellan
Minister of Transport – David Anderson then David Collenette
Minister of Citizenship and Immigration – Lucienne Robillard
Minister of Fisheries and Oceans – Fred Mifflin then David Anderson
Minister of Agriculture – Ralph Goodale then Lyle Vanclief
Minister of Public Works and Government Services – Diane Marleau then Alfonso Gagliano
Minister of Human Resources Development – Pierre Pettigrew
Minister of Natural Resources – Anne McLellan then Ralph Goodale

Members of Parliament
See: 35th Canadian parliament, 36th Canadian parliament

Party leaders
Liberal Party of Canada –  Jean Chrétien
Bloc Québécois – Michel Gauthier then Gilles Duceppe
New Democratic Party- Alexa McDonough
Progressive Conservative Party of Canada – Jean Charest
Reform Party of Canada – Preston Manning

Supreme Court Justices
Chief Justice: Antonio Lamer
Beverley McLachlin
Frank Iacobucci
John C. Major
Gérard V. La Forest then Michel Bastarache
John Sopinka (retired November 24)
Peter deCarteret Cory
Claire L'Heureux-Dubé
Charles D. Gonthier

Other
Speaker of the House of Commons – Gilbert Parent
Governor of the Bank of Canada – Gordon Thiessen
Chief of the Defence Staff – Vice-Admiral Larry Murray then General Maurice Baril

Provinces

Premiers
Premier of Alberta – Ralph Klein
Premier of British Columbia – Glen Clark
Premier of Manitoba – Gary Filmon
Premier of New Brunswick – Frank McKenna then Raymond Frenette
Premier of Newfoundland – Brian Tobin
Premier of Nova Scotia – John Savage then Russell MacLellan
Premier of Ontario – Mike Harris
Premier of Prince Edward Island – Pat Binns
Premier of Quebec – Lucien Bouchard
Premier of Saskatchewan – Roy Romanow
Premier of the Northwest Territories – Don Morin
Premier of Yukon – Piers McDonald

Lieutenant-governors
Lieutenant-Governor of Alberta – Bud Olson
Lieutenant-Governor of British Columbia – Garde Gardom
Lieutenant-Governor of Manitoba – Yvon Dumont
Lieutenant-Governor of New Brunswick – Margaret Norrie McCain then Marilyn Trenholme Counsell
Lieutenant-Governor of Newfoundland and Labrador – Frederick Russell then Arthur Maxwell House
Lieutenant-Governor of Nova Scotia – James Kinley
Lieutenant-Governor of Ontario – Hal Jackman then Hilary Weston
Lieutenant-Governor of Prince Edward Island – Gilbert Clements
Lieutenant-Governor of Quebec – Jean-Louis Roux then Lise Thibault
Lieutenant-Governor of Saskatchewan – Jack Wiebe

Mayors
Toronto – Barbara Hall
Montreal – Pierre Bourque
Vancouver – Philip Owen
Ottawa – Jacquelin Holzman then Jim Watson

Religious leaders
Roman Catholic Bishop of Quebec –  Archbishop Maurice Couture
Roman Catholic Bishop of Montreal –  Cardinal Archbishop Jean-Claude Turcotte
Roman Catholic Bishops of London – Bishop John Michael Sherlock
Moderator of the United Church of Canada – Marion Best then Bill Phipps

See also
1996 Canadian incumbents
Events in Canada in 1997
1998 Canadian incumbents
Governmental leaders in 1997
Canadian incumbents by year

1997
Incumbents
1997 in Canadian politics
Canadian leaders